The Treaty or Peace of Baden, signed on 16 June 1718, ended the Toggenburg War among the members of the Old Swiss Confederacy.

References

Wars involving Switzerland
18th century in the Old Swiss Confederacy